Solaria is a genus of South American plants in the family Amaryllidaceae, subfamily Allioideae, tribe Gilliesieae, native to Chile and Argentina.

The genus is named in honor of Chilean mathematician Francisco Borja de Solar.

Species

 Solaria atropurpurea (Phil.) Ravenna - Chile (O'Higgins, Santiago)
 Solaria attenuata Ravenna - Chile, Argentina (Neuquén)
 Solaria brevicoalita Ravenna - Chile (Maule)
 Solaria curacavina Ravenna - Chile (Santiago)
 Solaria cuspidata (Harv. ex Baker) Ravenna - Chile (Coquimbo)
 Solaria miersioides Phil. - Chile

References

Amaryllidaceae genera
Allioideae